The 1997 AAA Championships was an outdoor track and field competition organised by the Amateur Athletic Association (AAA), held from 24 to 25 July at Alexander Stadium in Birmingham, England. First the first time, it was not considered the national championships for the United Kingdom, as the 1997 British Athletics Championships (which incorporated the trials for the 1997 World Championships in Athletics) attracted a higher standard of national competitors than the AAA one. The British Athletics Federation's decision to hold its trials separately was taken due to the organisation's financial problems, which would ultimately result in its bankruptcy.

Medal summary

Men

Women

References

AAA Championships
AAA Championships
Athletics Outdoor
AAA Championships
Sports competitions in Birmingham, West Midlands
Athletics competitions in England